Fulvivirga kasyanovii is a Gram-negative, heterotrophic and strictly aerobic bacterium from the genus of Fulvivirga which has been isolated from seawater from a mussel farm.

References

External links
Type strain of Fulvivirga kasyanovii at BacDive -  the Bacterial Diversity Metadatabase

Cytophagia
Bacteria described in 2007